The Brazos Valley Symphony Orchestra is an American symphony orchestra based in College Station, Texas.  The orchestra celebrated its 30th season in 2012.  It is an affiliate of the  Arts Council of Brazos Valley, and a member of the Texas Association of Symphony Orchestras and the League of American Orchestras. Marcelo Bussiki is the musical director

References

External links
 Brazos Valley Symphony Orchestra (official site)
 Arts Council of the Brazos Valley
 Texas Association of Symphony Orchestras
 League of American Orchestras

Texas classical music
Musical groups established in 1981
Orchestras based in Texas
College Station, Texas